Wanda Zuma (born 7 September 1991) is a South African actor best known for his starring role as Nkosi Zwide in House of Zwide at e.tv.

Zuma is from Umlazi. He attended Grosvenor Boys’ High School where he obtained his matric in 2009 and studied Drama at Creative Arts College, graduating in 2014. He furthered his acting formal training from the South African Film Institute and the Playhouse Company.

References

1991 births
Living people
People from KwaZulu-Natal
South African male actors